Valley Downs is a neighborhood of Louisville, Kentucky, USA located along Omar Khayyam Boulevard south of Johnsontown Road.

Geography

References
  

Neighborhoods in Louisville, Kentucky